NGC 7790 is a young open cluster of stars located some 10,800 light years away from Earth in the northern constellation of Cassiopeia. At this distance, the light from the cluster has undergone extinction from interstellar gas and dust equal to E(B – V ) = 0.51 magnitude in the UBV photometric system. NGC 7790 has a Trumpler class rating of II2m and the estimated age is 60–80 million years. It contains three cepheid variables: CEa Cas, CEb Cas, and CF Cas.

This cluster is on an orbit through the Milky Way galaxy that has an eccentricity of 0.22 ± 0.07 and a period of (225.0 ± 27.1) million years. On average, it will cross the galactic plane every (35.7 ± 13.0) million years.

References

External links
 
 

7790
Open clusters
Cassiopeia (constellation)